Kotovsky District is an administrative district (raion), one of the thirty-three in Volgograd Oblast, Russia. As a municipal division, it is incorporated as Kotovsky Municipal District. It is located in the north of the oblast. Its administrative center is the town of Kotovo. Population:  38,700 (2002 Census);  The population of Kotovo accounts for 69.9% of the district's total population.

References

Notes

Sources

Districts of Volgograd Oblast